Pilot Mill is a historic textile mill complex located at Raleigh, Wake County, North Carolina.  The original building was built in 1894, and is a two-story, vernacular brick structure, 33 bays long and 7 bays wide.  The upper windows are arched and the building has a three-story, square, corner tower.  The building was extended sometime before 1903 and again prior to 1914.  The other contributing buildings include the one-story dye house (c. 1896, c. 1914, c. 1917); a two-story connecting structure (c. 1920); and two-story, Classical Revival style office, shipping and inspection building (c. 1910).  The mill operated until 1982.

It was listed on the National Register of Historic Places in 1989.

References

Textile mills in North Carolina
Industrial buildings and structures on the National Register of Historic Places in North Carolina
Neoclassical architecture in North Carolina
Industrial buildings completed in 1894
Buildings and structures in Raleigh, North Carolina
National Register of Historic Places in Raleigh, North Carolina
Historic districts on the National Register of Historic Places in North Carolina